LY-2109761 is a synthetic compound which acts as a potent and selective inhibitor for the growth factor receptor TGF beta receptor 1. It is used for research into conditions such as pulmonary fibrosis and cancer.

See also 
 Galunisertib
 GW788388

References 

Kinase inhibitors